The vagina is an internal sex organ in female mammals.
Vagina may also refer to:

Anatomy
The vagina of the portal vein.
Vagina tendinis, the fibrous sheath around tendons:
Called a vagina fibrosa when solid
Called a vagina mucosa when it contains a fluid-filled cavity around the tendon
Vagina bulbi, bulbar vagina, the sheath of the eyeball
Vagina musculi recti abdominis, rectus sheath
Vagina processus styloidei, sheath of styloid process

In publishing
 Vagina (journal), an American lesbian magazine in the 1970s
 Vagina: A New Biography, a book by Naomi Wolf

Geography
 Vagina, Krasnoyarsk Krai, Russia
 Vagina, Kurgan Oblast, Russia
 Wagina Island, Solomon Islands

In music
Vagina (album), album by Alaska Thunderfuck
"Vagina" (song), song by Cupcakke

See also
 Vulva (disambiguation)